Daniel Paul Bard (born June 25, 1985) is an American professional baseball pitcher for the Colorado Rockies of Major League Baseball (MLB). He previously played for the Boston Red Sox from 2009 to 2013. In 2011, Bard set a Red Sox team record with 25 consecutive scoreless appearances. In subsequent years, Bard experienced a loss of control over his pitches, derailing his playing career. After pitching in only two major league games during 2013, he played for several minor league teams before retiring in 2017 to become a player mentor. In 2020, Bard returned as a player after regaining his control, earned a spot on the Rockies' MLB roster, and went on to win the National League Comeback Player of the Year Award as their closing pitcher.

College career
Bard attended Charlotte Christian School and then played college baseball at the University of North Carolina. At the midpoint of the 2004 season, Baseball America named Bard the top freshman pitcher in the U.S., and gave him Freshman All-America honors. For his season's work, Bard was named to the Baseball America All-Freshman second team, and was named a Freshman All-American by Collegiate Baseball. He was Atlantic Coast Conference (ACC) freshman of the year, and earned first-team all-conference honors. In 16 games pitched, Bard was 8–4 with a 3.88 earned run average (ERA); his eight wins tied the North Carolina Tar Heels baseball freshman record.

For the 2005 season, Bard was named preseason first-team All-America by Baseball America and was named preseason third-team All-America by Collegiate Baseball and by the National Collegiate Baseball Writers Association. Bard went 7–5 with a 4.22 ERA in 16 starts. and was third in the ACC in opponents' batting average at .219. He was named to the Roger Clemens Award watch list.

Bard was a second-team summer All-American selection in the 2005 Cape Cod League after a successful summer with the Wareham Gatemen, where he led the league in innings pitched and strikeouts, while finishing third in ERA. Bard and fellow North Carolina left-hander Andrew Miller were rated the top two prospects in the Cape Cod League. Bard and Miller led North Carolina to the College World Series, where they lost to Oregon State, two games to one. He finished his junior year with a 9–4 record and a 3.64 ERA in 17 starts.  He earned ACC pitcher of the week honors twice during the 2006 season.

Professional career

Boston Red Sox
On June 6, 2006, Bard was selected in the first round (28th overall) of the 2006 MLB draft by the Boston Red Sox. He was selected as a compensation pick from the New York Yankees for the signing of Johnny Damon. On September 4, Bard signed with the team. He admitted he had enrolled in classes at the University of North Carolina as a backup plan in case a deal with the Red Sox was not finalized in time. Bard had been previously selected in the 20th round with the 604th overall selection out of high school by the New York Yankees in the 2003 MLB draft, but did not sign.

Minor leagues
Drafted as a starting pitcher, Bard spent the 2007 season in the same role, starting all 22 of his appearances with the Greenville Drive and Lancaster JetHawks. Unfortunately for Bard, the results were disastrous: He posted a 7.05 ERA between the two levels, and walked 78 batters in  innings pitched. Because of the poor success starting, at the end of the 2007 season he was moved into the bullpen to pitch as a reliever. While pitching out of the bullpen for the Honolulu Sharks of the Hawaii Winter Baseball league, Bard put up a 1.08 ERA in 16 appearances. His control remained an issue, but with some improvement.

Remaining in the bullpen during 2008, Bard split time between the Greenville Drive and Portland Sea Dogs. He posted a 1.51 ERA and had 107 strikeouts in  innings of work, and was named the 2008 Minor League Pitcher of the Year by the Red Sox.

Bard began the 2009 season with the Triple-A Pawtucket Red Sox. He faced 58 batters in 16 innings, giving up six hits and striking out 29. Of those six hits, two were home runs.

2009
On May 10, 2009, Red Sox pitcher Javier López was designated for assignment, and Bard was called up from Triple-A. On May 13, 2009, he made his major-league debut against the Los Angeles Angels of Anaheim, pitching two scoreless innings in an 8–4 loss.

Bard made his debut at Fenway Park on May 20, against the Toronto Blue Jays in the 8th inning. He gave up two hits on the first two pitches thrown, eventually giving up a run. He pitched  of an inning before being replaced by left-hander Hideki Okajima after the second out, leaving two runners on base. He recorded his first career save in the 13th inning of a 5–2 victory against the Philadelphia Phillies. Although he gave up a walk and hit a batter, Bard managed to strike out the side to clinch the save. Bard recorded his first major league win on August 26, against the Chicago White Sox after pitching a scoreless inning and a third in the eight and ninth followed by a walk off home run by David Ortiz.

Bard was a post-season correspondent for ESPN.

2010
Bard was the primary setup man in the bullpen once again. He appeared in 73 games, posted a 1.93 ERA and 1.00 WHIP on the season, with 76 strikeouts.

2011
Bard set the club record with 25 consecutive scoreless appearances, running from May 27 to July 31. The previous record was held by Ugueth Urbina.

Bard's season, like that of his team, came to a crushing end. After dazzling for most of 2011, Bard had a terrible last month of the year: He finished September 0–4 with a 10.64 ERA, issuing more walks (nine) than he had in the previous three months combined (eight). Based on win probability added, the player most responsible for Boston's collapse was Bard.

2012
The Red Sox made Bard a starting pitcher for 2012. He started the season 5–6 with a 5.24 ERA, striking out 34 while walking 37 and hitting eight batters. On June 5, 2012, Bard was optioned to AAA Pawtucket. In his last start prior to his demotion, he lasted 1.2 innings against the Toronto Blue Jays, giving up five runs, six walks, and hitting two batters. Bard continued to struggle in AAA, surrendering 15 walks and posting a 7.08 ERA in  innings through the end of July.
Bard was recalled on August 30 when Zach Stewart was optioned out.

2013
Bard started the 2013 season in the team's Double-A affiliate in Portland. He was recalled on April 23 and made two appearances, allowing one earned run in a total of one inning pitched; this would be his final major league appearances for Boston. On April 28, he was optioned back to Portland to make room for returning reliever Joel Hanrahan. He was designated for assignment on September 1.

Chicago Cubs
On September 4, 2013, Bard was claimed off waivers by the Chicago Cubs from the Red Sox. He became a free agent on December 2, 2013, after being non-tendered by the Cubs.

Texas Rangers
On January 31, 2014, Bard signed with the Texas Rangers.  He inexplicably lost command of his pitches, walking nine and hitting seven batters while recording two outs in a stint for the Rangers' Single-A club.  On June 19, 2014, Bard was released by the Rangers.

Second stint with Cubs
The Chicago Cubs signed Bard to a minor-league deal on January 18, 2015. He did not appear in any games during the 2015 season. Bard became a free agent after the 2015 season.

Pittsburgh Pirates
On January 11, 2016, Bard signed a minor league deal with the Pittsburgh Pirates. After failing to make a minor league appearance, Bard was released on May 14, 2016.

St. Louis Cardinals
On June 6, 2016, Bard signed a minor league deal with the St. Louis Cardinals. He made eight minor league appearances for the Palm Beach Cardinals during the 2016 season, allowing eight earned runs in three innings pitched. He then made 10 appearances for the Springfield Cardinals in 2017, allowing 10 earned runs in  innings. He was released on May 18, 2017.

New York Mets
On June 11, 2017, Bard signed a minor league deal with the New York Mets. He made a single appearance with the GCL Mets, allowing four earned runs in two-thirds of an inning.

Bard retired on October 3, 2017. He was hired by the Arizona Diamondbacks on February 1, 2018, to serve as a franchise player mentor.

Colorado Rockies

In February 2020, Bard threw for scouts, and announced he was going to attempt a comeback. On February 22, 2020, Bard signed a minor league deal with the Colorado Rockies, and was subsequently assigned to their Triple-A team, the Albuquerque Isotopes. On July 17, 2020, it was announced that Bard would have his contract selected to the 40-man roster by the Rockies in advance of Opening Day. His contract was selected the following day. On July 25, 2020, Bard played in his first MLB game since 2013, pitching  scoreless innings in relief. He was credited with the win, his first since May 29, 2012. On August 11, 2020, he was credited with the save, his first since 2011. Bard had his best pitching output since 2011, as he recorded 6 saves in  innings. He also struck out 27 with just 10 walks as he bettered his control. He was named the NL Comeback Player of the Year and received the Tony Conigliaro Award. Bard had an inconsistent 2021 season, as he posted a record of 7–8 with a 5.21 ERA in 67 games. He was 20-for-28 in save opportunities. 

On March 22, 2022, Bard signed a $4.4 million contract with the Rockies, avoiding salary arbitration. Bard's 2022 season got off to a strong start, posting 22 saves in 24 chances with an ERA of 1.86 through the end of July. On July 30, 2022, Bard agreed to a 2-year, $19 million contract extension with the Rockies. Bard finished the 2022 season with 34 saves in 37 chances and posted an ERA of 1.79 for the season. He struck out 69 batters in 60.1 innings pitched while walking 25 batters.

World Baseball Classic
Bard played for Team USA in the 2023 World Baseball Classic (WBC) as a relief pitcher.

Pitching style
As of 2012, Bard threw four pitches. About half of his pitches thrown were four-seam fastballs in the range of 92–96 mph. He could touch and break  with the two-seamer. Bard's changeup was used almost exclusively against left-handed hitters. He used the slider against lefties as well, but much more so against right-handers. Bard's velocity on all of his pitch types dipped several miles per hour in 2012, presumably as a result of his conversion from a relief pitcher to a starter. Bard said he was mildly surprised, but not alarmed by the drop: "I knew there’d be somewhat of a drop-off, velocity-wise, when I went to starting. I didn’t think it would be quite this big ... When I’m 93, 94, they’re just as late as they were on that 97. I think it’s the way I’ve been able to set it up. If I can just establish strike one a little more consistently, the velocity can be whatever it wants to be."

During Bard's tenure with the Rockies, Bard has remained a power pitcher. In every year with the Rockies, Bard has utilized his slider more and more, to the extent that Bard throws a slider more often than sinker. Bard's fastball is considered more of a sinker, having lots of movement. Despite the increased slider usage, Bard's fastball velocity remains very high, and Bard remains capable of touching 100 miles per hour with the pitch. Bard occasionally throws a changeup, but only on rare occasion.

Personal life
Bard and his wife Adair married in 2010, have three children together, and reside in Greenville, South Carolina.

His brother, Luke, played college baseball at Georgia Tech and was drafted by the Minnesota Twins in the first round of the 2012 Major League Baseball draft. Luke Bard made his major league debut for the Los Angeles Angels on March 31, 2018. His cousin John Andreoli is also a professional baseball player; he made his major league debut for the Seattle Mariners on May 23, 2018, and currently plays in the Philadelphia Phillies organization.

References

Further reading

External links

Daniel Bard at soxprospects.com
UNC profile of Bard via Wayback Machine

1985 births
Living people
Baseball players from Houston
Boston Red Sox players
Charlotte Christian School alumni
Colorado Rockies players
Criollos de Caguas players
Greenville Drive players
Gulf Coast Red Sox players
Hickory Crawdads players
Lancaster JetHawks players
Liga de Béisbol Profesional Roberto Clemente pitchers
Lowell Spinners players
Major League Baseball pitchers
North Carolina Tar Heels baseball players
Palm Beach Cardinals players
Pawtucket Red Sox players
Portland Sea Dogs players
Springfield Cardinals players
United States national baseball team players
Wareham Gatemen players
2023 World Baseball Classic players